Li Gu (903-August 12, 960), courtesy name Weizhen, formally the Duke of Zhao, was an official of the Later Tang, Later Jin, Later Han, and Later Zhou, Liao, and Northern Song dynasties of China. He served as a chancellor under the Later Zhou dynasty.

Background 
Li Gu was born in 903, late in the Tang Dynasty.  He was said to be from Ruyin (汝陰, in modern Fuyang, Anhui).  He was tall and handsome, and in his youth wanted to be a fighter for justice, but was restricted by the people of his home territory.  He thus resolved to study hard, and he became learned.

During Later Tang 
In 929 — which was during the reign of the Later Tang emperor Li Siyuan — Li Gu passed the imperial examinations in the Jinshi class.  He subsequently successively served as a secretary to the prefects of Hua (華州, in modern Weinan, Shaanxi) and Tai (泰州, may be in modern Yuncheng, Shanxi) Prefectures.  (However, historical accounts also, inconsistently, already gave him the title of Jinshi as of 926 — as, that year, he was recorded to have helped a friend, Han Xizai, in fleeing to Later Tang's southeastern neighbor Wu after Han's father was caught up in a rebellion and executed.  It was said that Li accompanied Han to the two states' border post Zhengyang (正陽, on the border of modern Fuyang and Lu'an, Anhui), on the Huai River, to send him off.  They drank together before parting with each other.  At that time, Han made the comment, "If Wu makes me a chancellor, I will surely invade and conquer the Central Plains."  Li laughed and responded, "If the Central Plains makes me a chancellor, for me to take Wu would be as easy as taking something out of a sack."  Han then entered Wu realm.

During Later Jin 
During the subsequent Later Jin, Li Gu became an imperial censor with the title of Jiancha Yushi.  When Shi Chonggui, the nephew of the founding emperor Shi Jingtang (Li Siyuan's son-in-law), served as the mayor of then-capital Kaifeng, Li Gu served as an assistant to him, as well as Taichang Cheng, the secretary general of the ministry of worship.  Subsequently, when Shi Jingtang himself took up residence at Yedu (鄴都, in modern Handan, Hebei) for some time and left Shi Chonggui in charge at Kaifeng, Li Gu was given the additional title of Yubu Yuanwailang, a low-level official at the minister of public works (工部, Gongbu).  When Shi Chonggui was subsequently made the mayor of Guangjin (廣晉, i.e., Yedu), Li followed him to Guangjin and continued to serve as his assistant.

In 942, Shi Jingtang died, and Shi Chonggui succeeded him as emperor.  He made Li Zhifang Langzhong, a supervisory official at the ministry of civil service (吏部, Libu).  Shortly after, Li was made Libu Langzhong — also a supervisory official at the ministry of civil service, as well as secretary at the treasury (度支判官, Duzhi).  At some point, for reasons lost to history, Li was removed from his offices.  In 944, when Shi Chonggui personally led a campaign against Later Jin's northern neighbor Khitan Empire, he issued an edict asking Li to accompany him on the campaign, and he made Li an imperial scholar at the office of the chief of staff (樞密直學士, Shumi Zhi Xueshi), as well as imperial attendant (給事中, Jishizhong).  However, Li was disliked by Shi Chonggui's close associates Feng Yu and Li Yantao.  When Shi Chonggui later led another campaign against Khitan, Li Gu was made the deputy director of the three financial ministries (i.e., treasury, taxation, and salt and iron monopolies).

In fall 945, Li Gu was made the prefect of Ci Prefecture (磁州, in modern Handan), and the director of military supplies for the army in the north (i.e., the army against Khitan).  In 946, when Shi Chonggui commissioned the generals Du Wei and Li Shouzhen to command a major campaign against Khitan, Li Gu apparently accompanied the army, and suggested to Du and Li Shouzhen that they attack the main Khitan force (which was then sieging Later Jin's Heng Prefecture (恆州, in modern Shijiazhuang, Hebei)) quickly, before the Khitan army could be prepared for the Later Jin army.  Du and Li Shouzhen, however, did not listen to him, and instead sent him away to requisition supplies from Huai (懷州, in modern Jiaozuo, Henan) and Meng (孟州, in modern Luoyang, Henan) Prefectures.  Believing that Du and Li Shouzhen were about to lead the Later Jin army into a major disaster (as the Khitan army, after realizing the Later Jin army was approaching, began to cut off its supply routes), Li Gu secretly submitted a petition to Shi Chonggui, urging him to head to the frontline himself quickly with the generals Gao Xingzhou and Fu Yanqing, but the petition either did not reach Shi or was not heeded.  When the Khitan army subsequently had the Later Jin army surrounded, Du and Li Shouzhen surrendered the army to Khitan's Emperor Taizong.  Emperor Taizong then quickly headed toward the effectively defenseless Kaifeng, forcing Shi to surrender and ending Later Jin.

During Liao Dynasty 
The Khitan emperor entered Kaifeng and renamed his state Liao Dynasty, taking on Han Chinese garbs and apparently intending on ruling both the former Later Jin territory as well as his own empire as one.  He sent Shi Chonggui and his family toward Khitan territory on exile.  The former Later Jin emperor's train was not well-supplied, but his former subjects did not dare to provide supplies.  However, when Shi's train went through Ci Prefecture, Li Gu greeted him on the way, and they both wept.  Li stated, "Your subject did not have an excuse for failing Your Imperial Majesty."  He gave what he had to Shi and sent Shi away on the trek to Khitan territory.

Meanwhile, most of Later Jin officials submitted to the Liao emperor at least nominally, but one of the strongest Later Jin generals, Liu Zhiyuan the military governor of Hedong Circuit (河東, headquartered in modern Taiyuan, Shanxi), after initially also pretending to submit to Liao, declared himself the emperor of a new Later Han.  Li secretly submitted to Liu and encouraged Liu to have a bandit leader, Liang Hui, who had submitted to Later Han, attack nearby Xiang Prefecture (相州, in modern Handan), which Liu did, and Liang attacked and captured Xiang.  Subsequently, the Liao emperor attacked Xiang, killed Liang, and slaughtered the city.  Under the belief that Li had secretly submitted to Later Han, he had Li arrested and accused him of treason, but Li denied the allegations.  The Liao emperor pretended to be holding letters that he had intercepted between Li and the Later Han emperor, but Li, seeing through that it was an act, stated, "If this is real, please show me the evidence."  The Liao emperor interrogated him six times, but was unable to get him to admit that he had submitted to Later Han.  As Khitan laws dictate that a person who does not admit his crimes cannot be put to death, Li was spared and released.  Meanwhile, the Liao emperor had been ill, and he stated to Li, "When I advanced south, I was told by others that you said that I will surely be unable to return north.  What magic do you have that you were able to tell this?  Now I am very ill.  If you can save me, you will be rich and powerful."  Li responded, "I have no magic.  It is merely other people who want to harm me who spread this lie."

Meanwhile, as rebellions were rising against Liao rule, Emperor Taizong resolved to leave Kaifeng and return to Khitan territory.  However, he died on the way, while near Heng Prefecture.  The main Khitan army entered Heng to consider their next step.  The ethnically Han major general Zhao Yanshou — to whom Emperor Taizong had initially promised the Chinese throne but later reneged on the promise — wanted to declare himself regent, but the Khitan princes resolved to declare Emperor Taizong's nephew Yelü Ruan (also known as Yelü Wuyu) the Prince of Yongkang the new emperor.  Yelü Ruan subsequently arrested Zhao and then declared himself emperor (as Emperor Shizong).  Faced with a succession challenge from his grandmother (Emperor Taizong's mother) Empress Dowager Shulü, who wanted to make his uncle Yelü Lihu, who carried the title of Crown Prince, emperor, he took his army and advanced north to face Empress Dowager Shulü's army, leaving the general Mada in charge at Heng Prefecture.  He left the vast majority of former Later Jin officials, whom Emperor Taizong had taken with him on his trek back north, at Heng Prefecture; this group of officials included Li Gu.

By this point, Liu Zhiyuan had entered Kaifeng.  Hearing that news, the Han soldiers in the Liao army at Heng rose against the Khitan, under the leadership of the officers Li Rong and Bai Zairong.  The Han and Khitan soldiers battled within the city walls, and initially, the battle was going badly against the Han soldiers.  Li Gu, wanting to encourage the Han soldiers, asked three senior Later Jin chancellors, Feng Dao, Li Song, and He Ning, to visit the battle scene to encourage the soldiers.  When the soldiers saw the three senior chancellors, they were encouraged, and they fought harder, eventually expelling the Khitan soldiers out of the city.  Subsequently, the soldiers supported Bai to be the acting military governor of Chengde, so that he could submit to Later Han and seek aid.  Meanwhile, Bai, who was greedy, wanted to kill Li Song and He Ning to seize their wealth.  Li Gu rebuked him, pointing out that if he did so, the new Later Han emperor would surely have him punished, so Bai did not do so.  Li Gu also then dissuaded Bai from seizing the wealth of the people to give to the soldiers.

During Later Han 
Li Gu was subsequently recalled to the Later Han imperial government and promoted to Zuo Sanqi Changshi, a high-level consultant at the examination bureau of government (門下省, Menxia Sheng).  He was shortly after made the acting mayor of Kaifeng.  And that time, there was much banditry in the region, particularly most serious at Zhongmou (中牟, in modern Zhengzhou, Henan).  Li had known of a capable old administrator from Later Liang (which existed between Tang and Later Tang), Liu Deyu, who had retired and taken up residence at Zhongmou.  He made Liu the secretary general at the Zhongmou County government, and sent several thousand imperial guard soldiers to serve under Liu.  They captured the bandits, finding out that their leaders included a county administrator and an administrator at the Office of the Imperial Censors (御史臺, Yushi Tai) — apparently explaining why the banditry went unabated earlier — and recovering much of the wealth the bandits had taken earlier.  From that point on, the travelers could go through Zhongmou without trouble.  Shortly after, Li was made the deputy minister of public works (工部侍郎, Gongbu Shilang).

In 948, by which time Liu Zhiyuan's son and successor Liu Chengyou was emperor, there were three rebellions that rose simultaneously in the west — with Li Shouzhen, then the military governor of Huguo Circuit (護國, headquartered in modern Yuncheng), who declared himself the Prince of Liang, being the overall leader.  (The other two rebel leaders were Wang Jingchong the military governor of Fengxiang Circuit (鳳翔, headquartered in modern Baoji, Shaanxi), and the officer Zhao Siwan, who occupied Yongxing Circuit (永興, headquartered in modern Xi'an, Shaanxi).)  The Later Han imperial government sent the major general Guo Wei against the rebels.  As part of the operations, Li Gu was put in charge of supplying Guo's army.  At that time, the collective leadership at the Later Han imperial government (put in place by Liu Zhiyuan as Liu Chengyou was still young and unable to oversee governance himself) was considered chaotic, and Guo was respected by the people.  He secretly talked with Li Gu about that, but Li Gu did not encourage him to have further ambitions, but rather only encouraged him to be faithful.  This disappointed Guo but drew Guo's respect for him.  After Guo successfully defeated the rebels, Li Gu was made the prefect of Chen Prefecture (陳州, in modern Zhoukou, Henan).

As Liu Chengyou grew in age, he resented the officials that Liu Zhiyuan left in control of the imperial government, believing that they were stopping him from truly governing the state.  In 950, he ambushed three of them — the chief of staff Yang Bin, the commander of the imperial guards Shi Hongzhao, and the director of the financial agencies Wang Zhang — and killed them and their families.  As he believed that Guo was part of this group of officials who restrained him, he also sent orders to Li Hongyi the military governor of Zhenning Circuit (鎮寧, headquartered in modern Puyang, Henan), to have Guo, who was then serving as the defender of Yedu, killed as well, and slaughtered Guo's family members at the capital Kaifeng.  He summoned a group of generals and officials who were then not at the capital to the capital, apparently intending to have them take over the positions vacated by the officials he killed.  Li was among this group of officials that he summoned, but it was unclear whether Li actually joined the imperial government at this point.  Meanwhile, Li Hongyi, concerned that Guo was already aware of the order, did not carry it out, and put Liu Chengyou's messenger under arrest, and then revealed everything to Guo.  Guo thereafter rebelled and attacked Kaifeng, defeating the imperial army that Liu Chengyou commanded himself; Liu Chengyou was killed in battle.  Guo entered the capital, and initially honored Liu Chengyou's mother Empress Dowager Li as regent while he ostensibly searched for a proper successor to the Later Han throne.  During this transition period, Li Gu was made the acting director of the financial agencies (treasury, taxation, and salt and iron monopolies).  Shortly after, though, Guo's soldiers supported him to be emperor, and he subsequently extracted Empress Dowager Li's agreement by promising to continue to honor her as a mother.  In spring 951, Empress Dowager Li declared him emperor, and he took the throne as the new emperor of a new Later Zhou.

During Later Zhou

During Guo Wei's reign 
After Guo Wei took the throne, he gave Li Gu, who was then referred to as the deputy minister of census (戶部侍郎, Hubu Shilang) in addition to being the acting director of the financial agencies, the title of Zhongshu Shilang (中書侍郎, deputy head of the legislative bureau) and gave him the designation of Tong Zhongshu Menxia Pingzhangshi, making Li a chancellor, along with Wang Jun and Fan Zhi; Li continued to serve as the acting director of the financial agencies.  The people and officials of Chen Prefecture, apparently wanting to ingratiate the new chancellor, requested that a temple be built for him even though he was still living; Li declined earnestly, and Guo agreed with him.

As chancellor, Li was said to be silent, resolute, and full of strategies.  He spoke convincingly before the emperor on important matters, and was often able to persuade the emperor by using analogies.  The previous laws (inherited from Later Han) forbid the common people from using cowhide for their own purposes (because the cowhides were needed for military purposes), and the laws were so harsh that violators were put to death.  Li effectuated a change in the laws such that only a portion, truly needed for military use, would be set aside, while the rest could be used by civilians.  He also ended the practice of conscripting the people for farm labor far away from home, requiring only that the people submit to duties in their home territory.  He also rebuilt his grandfather's and father's mansion at Luoyang (which was destroyed in the late-Tang Huang Chao Rebellion) and built houses around the mansion to allow his clansmen who were not serving in government to live and farm on the property.

In 952, when Guo was battling the rebellion by Liu Zhiyuan's half-brother Murong Yanchao at Yan Prefecture (兗州, in modern Jining, Shandong), he left Li in charge of the capital, as well as serving as the acting mayor of Kaifeng.  Later in the year (after Guo had destroyed Murong's rebellion), Li suffered injuries to his right arm in a fall, and requested to resign.  Guo did not allow him to resign, instead ordering him to simply attend to the affairs of state and not having to attend imperial meetings.

In 953, for reasons lost to history, Wang Jun, who had been Guo's closest associate ever since he joined Guo's rebellion against Liu Chengyou and who had been extremely powerful in Guo's administration, demanded that Guo replace Fan and Li as chancellors with Yan Kan and Chen Guan.  Guo initially attempted to dissuade Wang by telling him that that will happen later, but when Wang insisted, turned against Wang and put him under house arrest.  Wang died shortly after.

During Guo Rong's reign 
Guo Wei died in 954 and was succeeded by his adoptive son Guo Rong the Prince of Jin (the biological son of his brother-in-law Chai Shouli).  Almost immediately on Guo Rong's ascension to the throne, Liu Zhiyuan's brother Liu Min the emperor of Later Zhou's northwestern neighbor Northern Han (which claimed to be the legitimate successor to Later Han) launched a major attack on Later Zhou, allied with the Khitan Liao Dynasty to the north.  Against the advice of most of his officials and generals, Guo Rong decided to command the Later Zhou troops himself.  Li Gu accompanied him on the campaign.  The armies engaged at Gaoping (高平, in modern Jincheng, Shanxi).  The engagement initially went poorly for Later Zhou troops, and during the battle, the panic was such that Li had to hide in a valley.  However, the battle then turned against the Northern Han/Liao troops, and the Northern Han troops were routed.  Li, however, was unable to leave the valley for a few days, and only after that did he rejoin the victorious Guo Rong.  The Later Zhou emperor decided to advance and put the Northern Han capital Taiyuan under siege, and he had Li accompany there to be in charge of supplying the troops.  However, when the food supply ran out for the Later Zhou troops, Guo Rong withdrew the Later Zhou army.  Upon Guo Rong's return to Kaifeng, he gave Li the honorary title Sikong, made him Menxia Shilang (門下侍郎, the deputy head of the examination bureau), and put him in charge of editing the imperial history.  Li pointed out that during the past dynasties, there were imperial attendants recording the words and actions of the emperor, and that the history needed to be based on such records, but that this responsibility had been neglected during the wars.  He requested that imperial scholars be appointed to this task, and that their records be then turned over to the historians.  Later in the year, Guo Rong sent Li to oversee a project to rebuild Yellow River levees at Chan (澶州, in modern Anyang, Henan), Yun (鄆州, in modern Tai'an, Shandong), and Qi (齊州, in modern Jinan, Shandong) Prefectures.  (The Yellow River levees in the region had been destroyed years earlier, causing frequent massive flooding and great human misery, including famines, in the region, and over the years, the successive dynasties were unable to properly rebuild the levees.)  Under Li's supervision, 60,000 men were conscripted, and the project was completed in 30 days.

In winter 955, Guo Rong launched a major attack on Later Zhou's southeastern neighbor Southern Tang (the successor state to Wu).  He put Li in command of the army and made him acting governor of the Southern Tang prefectures that Later Zhou was seeking to capture, including Shou (壽州, in modern Lu'an) and Lu (廬州, in modern Hefei, Anhui) Prefectures, with the general Wang Yanchao serving as his deputy and 12 generals serving under them.  Li and Wang crossed the Huai at Zhengyang by means of a temporary floating bridge, and put Shou Prefecture under siege.  However, even though the Later Zhou army scored several victories against Southern Tang forces, Li was unable to capture Shou quickly.  In spring 956, fearful that the Southern Tang general Liu Yanzhen would destroy the bridge and leave the Later Zhou army with no means to retreat, he decided to withdraw back north of the Huai and await Guo, who had decided to lead an army himself to join the attack by that point, as well as the major general Li Chongjin (Guo's cousin).  Li's withdrawal drew disapproval from Guo, but turned out to work well for Later Zhou — as Liu believed it to be a sign of weakness and decided to prepare to attack the Later Zhou army, despite the dissuasions by Southern Tang's defender of Shou, Liu Renzhan.  When Li Chongjin subsequently arrived and engaged Liu Yanzhen, Liu Yanzhen's army was crushed — Liu Yanzhen himself was killed, and several of his subordinate generals were captured.  Guo subsequently had Li Chongjin replace Li Gu as the overall commander of the operations, while making Li Gu the acting governor of Shou, apparently having Li Gu overseeing the subsequent reinitiating of the siege against Shou.

In fall 956, with Guo himself back in Kaifeng but the campaign continuing, he recalled Li Gu to the capital.  Shortly after, Li suffered a stroke that led him to take a leave from governmental service.  After he was on leave for 100 days, he made repeated requests to retire.  Guo declined his requests and continued to have him serve as chancellor, often sending attendants to ask for his suggestion.  By spring 957 — at which time the Shou defenses were still holding under Liu Renzhan's capable defense, despite many heavy losses suffered by Southern Tang in other parts of the campaign, and many Later Zhou officials were calling for abandoning the Southern Tang campaign — Guo sent Fan Zhi and Wang Pu to Li's mansion to consult with him.  Li suggested that Guo himself again head to the Shou siege, believing that doing so would be a great morale booster for the Later Zhou forces and would destroy the morale of the Southern Tang forces.  When Guo went to Shou, the Later Zhou forces defeated the Southern Tang forces trying to lift the siege, and subsequently, with Liu Renzhan deathly ill, the Shou garrison surrendered to Later Zhou.  Guo rewarded Li greatly for his contributions.  Upon Guo's return to Kaifeng, Li again requested to retire, which Guo initially again declined but finally accepted in the fall, allowing him to keep only the position of Sikong while removing him from the chancellor post.  After the conclusion of the campaign in 958 — which ended with Southern Tang ceding all of its remaining territory north of the Yangtze River and submitting to Later Zhou as a vassal — Guo again rewarded Li greatly.

During Guo Zongxun's reign 
In 959, Guo Rong died, and his young son Guo Zongxun the Prince of Liang succeeded him as emperor.  The new emperor gave Li Gu the additional honorific title Kaifu Yitong Sansi and created him the Duke of Zhao.  Li subsequently requested retirement to Luoyang, and that request was granted.  Li Rong, whose name had been changed to Li Yun (to observe naming taboo for Guo Rong) was then the military governor of Zhaoyi Circuit (昭義, headquartered in modern Changzhi, Shanxi), and he, believing that Li Gu was a great chancellor, sent gifts of money and other materials to him, which Li Gu accepted.

During Song Dynasty 
In 960, the major general Zhao Kuangyin seized the throne in a coup, ending Later Zhou and starting a new Song Dynasty as its Emperor Taizu.  He sent a messenger to award Li Gu with further material rewards.

Shortly after the declaration of Song Dynasty, Li Yun rose against the new Song emperor from Zhaoyi.  Worried that he would be considered part of Li Yun's rebellion, Li Gu became distressed and fell seriously ill.  He died shortly after Li Yun killed himself after defeat.  The Song emperor gave him posthumous honors.

Notes and references 

 History of Song, vol. 262.
 Zizhi Tongjian, vols. 275, 285, 286, 287, 288, 290, 291, 292, 293.
 Xu Zizhi Tongjian, vol. 1.

903 births
960 deaths
Politicians from Fuyang
Later Tang politicians
Later Jin (Five Dynasties) politicians
Political office-holders in Henan
Liao dynasty politicians
Later Han (Five Dynasties) politicians
Later Zhou chancellors
Later Zhou generals
Song dynasty politicians from Anhui
Later Liang (Five Dynasties) people born during Tang
Political office-holders in Hebei
Later Zhou historians
Historians from Anhui
Generals from Anhui
10th-century Chinese historians